Mayors of Indian cities is the list of mayors of various cities and towns in India. A mayor in India is the head of the municipal corporation and first citizen of that city of town. Many cities and towns in India have mayors and the procedure to elect them varies from one state to another. The term of their office, their powers and the procedure for electing them too varies from one Indian state to another.

Current mayors
This is the list of current mayors in the Indian cites:

Lists of mayors 

 List of mayors of Ahmedabad
 List of mayors of Ahmednagar
 List of mayors of Allahabad
 List of mayors of Ayodhya
 List of mayors of Bangalore
 List of mayors of Bhopal
 List of mayors of Chennai
 List of mayors of Coimbatore
 List of mayors of Firozabad
 List of mayors of Hyderabad
 List of mayors of Kanpur
 List of mayors of Kolkata
 List of mayors of Kozhikode
 List of mayors of Lucknow
 List of mayors of Moradabad
 List of mayors of Mumbai
 List of mayors of Pune
 List of mayors of Srinagar
 List of mayors of Surat
 List of mayors of Trichy
 List of mayors of Varanasi
 List of mayors of Vasai-Virar
 List of mayors of Vijayawada
 List of mayors of Yanam

See also 
 List of the youngest mayors in India
 List of municipal corporations in India

Lists of mayors of places in India